Yuri Huang (born 11 April 1986) formerly known as Huang Yuzhu and Huang Yian, and known by her stage name Yao Yao, is a female singer, actress and model. She was born in Xinwu District, Taoyuan, Taiwan, and graduated from the School of Home Economics Chungli, Taoyan. Huang was a member of the girl group "Hey Girl" and debuted on 3 October 2005.

Her sister is Apple Huang, who is also a music artist. Together, they released a photobook titled 姊妹妄想曲：偷穿高跟鞋 .

Works

Records
2008 Dummy Run
Dummy Run's music videos record Yao Yao's events in 2006.

TV host
Channel V
Blackie Lollipop
Blackie's Teenage Club
VJ Pu Pu Feng
Meimei Pu Pu Feng
Where 5.com (14 September 2008, her sister Apple was host for 21 September)
Wo Ai Ouxiang
CTi Entertainment
Everybody Speaks Nonsenses II – Hot Pot (Assistant Moderator/Men Guo Nulang)
SET Metro
The Gang of Kuo Kuan (Assistant Moderator)
Hakka TV
Yao Yao Jiao Ni Shuo Ke Yu (6 October – 9 December 2008)
Much TV
Danche Er Shili (25 October 2008 –, Temporary hatch, it is only presided over a few episodes, but with its highest ratings)
China Television
Zhouri Da Jingcai (Location moderator, 30 August 2008)
Yahoo!
Yahoo Yule Bao (with her sister Apple; 8 July – 29 August 2013)
Dragon Television
Mi Gu Mingxing Xueyuan (Assistant Moderator)
IQiyi
Benpao Kaluli: Second Season guest (2016)
Ou Di Ge Shen A: First Season Kam group
Ou Di Ge Shen A: Second Season Kam group
Ou Di Ge Shen A: Third Season Kam group
Jiangsu Television
Duanwu Jinqu Lao panelist (2016)
Youku
Qianxing Zhe Jihua (2016)

Dramas
Chinese Television System/Gala Television
2006 Hanazakarino Kimitachihe Episode 11 (37:28-38:12) (Guest: as Liang Sinan's ex-girlfriend)
EBC Yoyo
2010 The M Riders1 (As Barbie)
Next TV/China Vision
2011 Material Queen (As Wang Dongxin Huan)

Short films
2014 Chao Pao Nulang

Music videos
Light (included in the Rene Liu album A Whole Night, 9 December 2005)
Yi Zhi Shengong (included in the Will Pan album Shishang Hun Yin Ku Yue, 22 December 2005)
Chujia (included in the Terry Lin album Yuansheng Zhi Lu, 30 Dec 2005)
101 (included in the Fish Leong album Worship, 9 Nov 2007)

Magazines
Juese Guangying magazine October 2007 cover character
Cosmore Juese Banyan Yule Qingbao Zhi Vol.7 (June 2008) cover character

Photo albums
2012
Apple Yao Yao Wangxiang Qu: Tou Chuan Gaogenxie Zhi Nu Nu Xiehen Ji

Advertising
Tsannkuen Signature article 38 Degrees article

Programme announcements
Huanle Zhiduoxing
Guanjun Renwu
Variety Together
Hot Door Night
Mr. Player
Super Followers (CTi Variety. CTi Entertainment)
Tiantian Yue Caishen
The Hunger Games

References

External links
 

1986 births
Living people
Taiwanese people of Hakka descent